Carpoxylinae is a subtribe of plants in the family Arecaceae.

Genera:
Carpoxylon
Neoveitchia
Satakentia

References

 
Arecaceae subtribes